Tresham is a village in Gloucestershire, England. It was transferred back from the county of Avon in 1991, having been in Gloucestershire before 1972. It is now in Stroud District, and forms part of the civil parish of Hillesley and Tresham. It is on the Monarch's Way and near the Cotswold Way.

According to Pevsner, Tresham Church dates from about 1855.

Burden Court Farm was originally the home of Charles II's Lord Chief Justice Sir Matthew Hale (1609–76). It was later the home of Lord (Jack) and Lady (Frances) Donaldson.

External links

Villages in Gloucestershire
Stroud District